Dicynodon ("two dog-teeth") is a genus of dicynodont therapsid that flourished during the Upper Permian period. Like all dicynodonts, it was herbivorous animal. This reptile was toothless, except for prominent tusks, hence the name. It probably cropped vegetation with a horny beak, much like a tortoise, while the tusks may have been used for digging up roots and tubers.

Many species of Dicynodon have been named, and the genus is considered a wastebasket taxon. A 2011 study of the genus found most of the species to represent a paraphyletic grouping, with the only valid members of Dicynodon being D. lacerticeps and D. huenei. A 2019 study named a new species D. angielczyki, but simultaneously transferred D. huenei to the genus Daptocephalus.

Description
 
Dicynodon was a medium-sized and advanced member of the Dicynodont group. Its fossil remains have been found in sediments of latest Permian age in South Africa and Tanzania.

The type species is Dicynodon lacerticeps Owen, 1845. A large number of species have since been placed in this genus, some of which turned out to be synonyms of other species, others have been moved to different genera.

Species
Two species of Dicynodon are currently recognized: the type species D. lacerticeps from South Africa and the species D. angielczyki from Tanzania. Since the genus was first named, over 160 species have been assigned to Dicynodon. A 2011 study of the genus found 11 of these species to be valid, although most are now assigned to other dicynodont genera. Below is a list of all species that have ever been assigned to Dicynodon. Since their naming, most have been considered as synonymous with other dicynodont species. Names in bold are still referable to Dicynodon.

See also

 List of therapsids
Dicynodont

References

 
 Lucas, S. G., 2005, Dicynodon (Reptilia: Therapsida) from the Upper Permian of Russia: biochronologic significance: In: The Nonmarine Permian; edited by Lucas, S. G., and Zeigler, K. E., New Mexico Museum of Natural History & Science, Bulletin 30, p. 192-196.

External links

 Dicynodon - Mikko's Phylogeny archive (list of species and cladogram)

Dicynodonts
Lopingian synapsids of Africa
Taxa named by Richard Owen
Fossil taxa described in 1845
Changhsingian genera
Anomodont genera